Xanthopterin is a yellow, crystalline solid that occurs mainly in the wings of butterflies and in the urine of mammals. Small microorganisms convert it into folic acid.  It is the end product of a non-conjugated pteridine compound and inhibits the growth of lymphocytes produced by concanavalin. High levels of the chemical were found in patients with liver disease and hemolysis, the latter increasing levels by 35%.

It was suggested, without direct proof, that the Oriental hornet uses xanthopterin as a light-harvesting molecule to transform light into electrical energy, which explains why the insects are more active when light intensity is greater. It remains an active and controversial area of scientific research (Plotkin et al., Naturwissenschaften (2010) 97:1067–1076).

References 

Pteridines
Lactams